Tirodi tehsil is a fourth-order administrative and revenue division, a subdivision of third-order administrative and revenue division of Balaghat district of Madhya Pradesh.

Geography
Tirodi tehsil has an area of 8.81 sq kilometers. It is bounded by Maharashtra in the southeast, south, southwest and west, Seoni district in the northwest, Katangi tehsil in the north and Khairlanji tehsil in the northeast and east.

See also 
Balaghat district

Citations

External links

Tehsils of Madhya Pradesh
Balaghat district